Harro Paul Harring (28 August 1798 – 14 May 1870) was a German-Danish revolutionary and writer. Often identified as Danish, he was, more accurately, from North Frisia in the Duchy of Schleswig.

Early life
Harring was the son of a farm owner in Schleswig. First employed in the customs, he went to Copenhagen to devote himself to military historical painting. In 1820, he lived in Vienna and Würzburg, and then returned to Denmark. In 1821 he fought in the Greek War of Independence, and then went to Rome, where he stayed a year, then to Vienna in order to concentrate again on art.

Subsequently Harring lived in Switzerland and in Munich, and worked in Vienna as a playwright at the Theater an der Wien. He was in Prague and later went to Warsaw (1828), to enter as a cornet in a Russian lancer regiment.

Itinerant revolutionary
As the 1830, July Revolution broke out in France, Harring returned to Germany, first to Braunschweig, then to Bavaria and Saxony. Expelled as a demagogue, he went to Strasbourg, where he edited the newspaper Das constitutionelle Deutschland and took part in the Hambach Festival (1832), but had to leave again for France.

Harring then lived in the Dijon–Châlons area, and met Mazzini. He took part in the republican attack on Savoie. He was arrested more than once in Switzerland, and expelled, after which he traveled to London. In May 1837, he was wounded in a gun battle and was living on the island of Helgoland. At that time a British colony where the inhabitants had no vote, his revolutionary views were unwelcome. The island governor Henry King ordered Harring to leave and sent for a warship to remove him. In September 1838, he was on Jersey, in the winter 1838-39 back in Helgoland, then in Bordeaux and Bruges; in 1841 he was in the Netherlands, and later lived in England and France. After a period in Brazil, in August 1843 he traveled to the United States, where he lived as a painter and writer.

The revolutions of 1848 lured Harring back to Germany. He was in Hamburg, then in Rendsburg, where he edited the newspaper Das Volk. In 1849, he was banished, and went to Christiania. His revolutionary writings on Norway incited the country to insurrection against its monarchical constitution. He had to leave in May 1850.

Later life
Harring first went to back to Copenhagen, and then again to London, where he participated in a European "democratic central committee", in a poor condition. When he went to Hamburg in the year 1854, he was immediately arrested, and only through the mediation of the American consul was he able to go to America, staying until 1856 in Rio Janeiro; and then returned to the United Kingdom. From Jersey, he asked the Danish government to grant him just one place on home ground. He lived alternately in London and Jersey.

Towards the end of his life, Harring suffered from mental illness. On 25 May 1870, he was found lying dead on the floor of his bedroom in Jersey.

He had poisoned himself with phosphorus, from matches.

Works
Harring was a prolific writer, of novels, drama and political verse. He published an autobiography in 1828, as Rhongar Jarr: Fahrten eines Friesen in Dänemark, Deutschland, Ungarn, Holland, Frankreich, Griechenland, Italien und der Schweiz.
Karl Marx, in order to diminish other German revolutionaries in the same mould, mocked Harring's memoirs as developing an archetype (Urbild) to which others (meaning Gottfried Kinkel, Arnold Ruge, and Gustav Struve in particular) sought to conform.

Bibliography 

 Blüthen der Jugendfahrt, 1821
 Dichtungen, 1821
 Erzählungen, 1825
 Der Psariot. Der Khan. Poetische Erzählungen, 1825
 Die Mainotten, 1825
 Der Wildschütze, 1825
 Der Student von Salamanca, 1825
 Cypressenlaub, Erzählungen, 1825
 Theokla. Der Armenier, 1827
 Erzählungen aus den Papieren eines Reisenden, 1827
 Szapary und Batthiany, Heldengedicht aus dem Ungarischen Türkenkriege, 1828
 Serenaden und Phantasien eines friesischen Sängers, nebst Klängen während des Stimmens (Vorläufer des Rhonghar Jarr), 1828
 Rhonghar Jarr. Fahrten eines Friesen in Dänemark, Deutschland, Ungarn, Holland, Frankreich, Griechenland, Italien und der Schweiz, 1828
 Theokla. Der Armenier, Trauerspiele, 1831
 Memoiren über Polen unter russischer Herrschaft. Nach zweijährigem Aufenthalt in Warschau, 1831
 Die Schwarzen von Giessen, oder der Deutsche Bund, 1831
 Julius von Dreyfalken, des Schwärmers Wahn und Ende, 1831
 Erzählungen aus den Papieren eines Reisenden, 1831
 Erinnerungen aus Warschau. Nachträge zu den Memoiren über Polen, 1831
 Faust im Gewande der Zeit. Ein Schattenspiel mit Licht, 1831
 Der Renegat auf Morea, Trauerspiel, 1831
 Rosabianca. Das hohe Lied des Friesischen Sängers (Harro Harring) im Exil, 1831
 Der Pole. Ein Character-Gemälde aus dem dritten Decenium unsers Jahrhunderts, 1831
 Der Livorneser Mönch, 1831
 Der Carbonaro zu Spoleto, 1831
 Firn - Mathes, des Wildschützen Flucht. Szenen im Bayrischen Hochlande, 1831
 Der Russische Unterthan, 1832
 Blutstropfen. Deutsche Gedichte, 1832
 Die Völker. Ein dramatisches Gedicht, 1832
 Gedanken über Wahrheit, Liebe und Gerechtigkeit. Entwurf zu einer Volksvertretung und zur Bildung eines Volkes, demokratischen Grundsätzen, 1832
 Splitter und Balken. Erzählungen, Lebensläufe, Reiseblumen, Gedichte und Aphorismen, nebst Briefen über Literatur, 1832
 Chronique scandaleuse des Petersburger Hofes seit den Zeiten der Kaiserin Elisabeth Oder: Geheime Memoiren zur politischen und Regentengeschichte des Russischen Reichs aus der Periode von 1740 bis zum Tode des Grosfürsten Constantin. Aus dem Nachlasse eines alten Staatsmannes, 1832
 Poland under the dominion of Russia. Printed for I. S. Szymanski, 1834
 Die Möwe. Deutsche Gedichte, 1835
 Traum des Scandinaviers, 1839
 Poesie eines Scandinaven, 1843
 Rede an die Nordfriesen auf dem Bredstedter Marktplatz, 1848. Historisches Fragment über die Entstehung der Arbeiter-Vereine und ihren Verfall in communistische Speculationen, 1852
 Dolores, Ein Charaktergemälde aus Süd-Amerika, 1858-1859
 Die Dynastie'', 1859

Notes

1798 births
1870 deaths
Danish revolutionaries
Danish male writers
German male writers
1870s suicides
Suicides by poison
Suicides in Jersey